Linum arenicola, known as sand flax, is a flowering plant in the flax family, Linaceae. It is endemic to Florida in the United States, where it is considered an endangered species.

References

arenicola
Endemic flora of Florida
Flora without expected TNC conservation status